Dorcadion profanifuga is a species of beetle in the family Cerambycidae. It was described by Plavilstshikov in 1951. It is known from Kazakhstan.

See also 
 Dorcadion

References

profanifuga
Beetles described in 1951